The Scout and Guide movement in Sudan is served by
 The Sudan Girl Guides Association, member of the World Association of Girl Guides and Girl Scouts
 Sudan Scouts Association, member of the World Organization of the Scout Movement

South Sudan
South Sudan became an independent country on July 9, 2011, at which time the organizations split.

References